ARA Bahía San Blas is an amphibious cargo ship of the Argentine Navy, capable of unloading landing craft, troops, vehicles and cargo. She is the first Argentine Navy ship to bear the name of San Blas Bay of in the south of Buenos Aires Province.

Design 

Bahía San Blas (B-4) is one of three  cargo ships ordered by the Argentine Navy in 1975, designed and built by the Argentine Príncipe, Menghi y Penco shipyard, at Buenos Aires, Argentina. The design is optimised for Patagonic coastal service.

Bahía San Blas has a steel hull and the superstructure at the stern, with a single mast and a single funnel atop, behind the bridge; the cargo area is located in the middle of the ship and three Liebherr cranes serve the three holds, one each.

History 
The ship is a  vessel built at Astilleros Príncipe, Menghi y Penco at Buenos Aires in 1978 entering service on November of that year in the Transport Maritime service of the Argentine Navy.

In 1991 she was deployed to the Persian Gulf during operations Desert Shield and Desert Storm carrying humanitarian aid and providing logistic support to the Argentine warships in the area.

In 1992 Bahía San Blas transported back from the Gulf of Fonseca the four Baradero-class patrol boats used under United Nations mandate ONUCA.

Since 2004, an Argentine contingent was deployed to Haiti under MINUSTAH mandate and Bahía San Blas has been used for logistic support making several voyages to the Caribbean island.

As of late 2016, Bahía San Blas remains in service with the Argentine Navy.

Footnotes

References

Notes

Bibliography

Further reading

External links 
 Argentine Navy official site, Costa Sur class page
 Bahia San Blas at Histarmar

Costa Sur class cargo ships
Amphibious warfare vessels of the Argentine Navy
Transports of the Argentine Navy
Ships built in Argentina
Gulf War ships of Argentina
1978 ships